Nirvana is an album by American jazz saxophonist Zoot Sims and guitarist Bucky Pizzarelli with special guest Buddy Rich recorded in 1974 and released on the Groove Merchant label.

Track listing
 "Somerset" (Torrie Zito) – 4:11
 "Honeysuckle Rose" (Fats Waller, Andy Razaf) – 3:57
 "A Summer Thing" (Zito) – 3:19
 "Somebody Loves Me" (George Gershwin, Ballard MacDonald, Buddy DeSylva) – 3:35
 "Gee, Baby, Ain't I Good to You" (Don Redman, Razaf) – 2:55
 "Nirvana" (Zoot Sims) – 4:14
 "Indiana" (James F. Hanley, MacDonald) – 4:02
 "Memories of You" (Eubie Blake, Razaf) – 4:05
 "Come Rain or Come Shine" (Harold Arlen, Johnny Mercer) – 4:35
 "Up a Lazy River" (Hoagy Carmichael, Sidney Arodin) – 3:22
 "Send in the Clowns" (Stephen Sondheim) – 2:28

Personnel
Zoot Sims – tenor saxophone, vocals on track 5
Bucky Pizzarelli – guitar
Milt Hinton – bass
Buddy Rich – drums (tracks 1–4 & 6–11), vocals on track 5
Stan Kay – drums (track 5)

References

Groove Merchant albums
Zoot Sims albums
Bucky Pizzarelli albums
1974 albums
Albums produced by Sonny Lester